Mesolambdolophus is an extinct genus of small odd-toed ungulate known from the Bridgerian North American Stage (late Early to early Middle Eocene) of Wyoming, United States. It is known only from the holotype MCZ 19585, a nearly complete mandible which was collected from the Bridger Formation. It was first named by Luke T. Holbrook and Joshua Lapergola in 2011 and the type species is Mesolambdolophus setoni.

References

Eocene odd-toed ungulates
Fossil taxa described in 2011
Eocene mammals of North America